The Nicaraguan Resistance Party ( - PRN) is a Nicaraguan political party founded in 1993 by the Contras, the armed opposition to the Sandinista government in the 1980s. 

The PRN contested in the 1996 general elections pulling less than 1% of the votes and obtaining 1 seat (out of 93) in the National Assembly. In the 2000 municipal elections and 2001 general elections, the PRN ran under the flag of the Constitutionalist Liberal Party.

In the 2004 municipal elections, the PRN ran independently for the first time since 1996. This time they won in the municipality Río Blanco, which has almost 40,000 inhabitants, including a large number of former Contras.

As of 2006, the PRN is split. The official board of the party and the local leaders are in alliance with the Nicaraguan Liberal Alliance. A faction of members of the PRN, including Salvador Talavera, who runs as a candidate on the Nicaraguan Liberal Alliance ballot, signed an agreement with the Sandinista National Liberation Front.

1993 establishments in Nicaragua
Contras
Political parties established in 1993
Political parties in Nicaragua